Donald Rae Wittman (October 9, 1936 – January 19, 2008) was a Canadian sportscaster.

Early life and education
Born in Herbert, Saskatchewan, Wittman attended the University of Saskatchewan and got his start in the field of broadcasting as a news reporter with CFQC radio in Saskatoon in 1955.

Career
Wittman began his long association with CBC Sports on January 1, 1961. He joined CBWT's supper-hour news program 24Hours in 1970 as sports anchor alternating with Bob Picken.  He also worked on Winnipeg Jets television and radio broadcasts.

During the late 1970s–early 1980s, Wittman hosted Western Express, a half-hour weekly program broadcast in Western Canada which consisted of lottery ticket drawings for the lottery of the same name. The format of the series included Wittman co-hosting with media and community personalities from towns and cities across the region and conducting interviews in-between ticket drawings. (Western Express later changed its name to The Western and converted to a scratch-card lottery format).

During the Munich massacre crisis at the 1972 Summer Olympics, Wittman and Bob Moir crawled through a hole in a fence to access the Olympic Village and give live reports, while posing as medical staff on the 1972 Canadian Olympic team. They filed radio reports to the CBC, and remained on location all day until the hostages were loaded onto a bus.

In a 1994 interview, Moir discussed the decision to sneak into the Olympic Village by saying,

As a sportscaster, Wittman covered many sports including athletics, baseball, basketball, golf, and was most known as a commentator and announcer for the CBC's CFL coverage, on Hockey Night in Canada, and for major Canadian and international curling tournaments.

Famous events covered by Wittman include Donovan Bailey's 100m sprint world record at the 1996 Summer Olympics and the infamous brawl between Canada and the Soviet Union at the 1987 World Junior Ice Hockey Championships.

Death
On January 19, 2008, Wittman died as a result of cancer in a Winnipeg hospital surrounded by his family. He was seventy-one years old, survived by his wife, Judy, two daughters, Karen and Kristen and a son, David.

Awards
Wittman won two ACTRA awards, was named Broadcaster of the Year by Sports Media Canada in 2002, and named to the Canadian Curling Hall of Fame in 2003.  He was inducted into the CBC Sports Hall of Fame in January 2008. Wittman is an "Honoured Member" of the Manitoba Hockey Hall of Fame. He was inducted into the Canadian Football Hall of Fame in 1990.

References

Further listening

External links
Don Wittman's biography at Manitoba Hockey Hall of Fame

Olympic Games broadcasters
Canadian television sportscasters
National Hockey League broadcasters
Winnipeg Jets announcers
University of Saskatchewan alumni
People from Winnipeg
Curling broadcasters
Canadian Football League announcers
CBC Television people
Deaths from cancer in Manitoba
1936 births
2008 deaths
People from Rural Municipality Excelsior No. 166, Saskatchewan
Track and field broadcasters
Canadian Football Hall of Fame inductees
World Hockey Association broadcasters